Taşağıl may refer to:

 Taşağıl, Aşkale
 Taşağıl, Ayvacık
 Taşağıl, Bolvadin
 Taşağıl, Çat
 Taşağıl, Manavgat
 Taşağıl, Pasinler